The Purdue Boilermakers baseball team is the varsity intercollegiate baseball program of Purdue University in West Lafayette, Indiana, United States. The program's first season was in 1888, and it has been a member of the NCAA Division I Big Ten Conference since the start of the 1906 season. Its home venue is Alexander Field, located on Purdue's campus. Greg Goff is the team's head coach starting in the 2020 season. The program has appeared in 3 NCAA Tournaments. It has won one conference tournament championship and 2 regular season conference titles. As of the start of the 2021 Major League Baseball season, 24 former Boilermakers have appeared in Major League Baseball.

History

Early history
The program's first season of play was 1888, and the team played without a head coach until 1892, when W. M. Phillips became the head coach.  Also in 1892, the program began playing at newly dedicated home venue Stuart Field.  The first game at Stuart was against Butler on April 16, 1892.  Purdue won the game 14–9.

After Phillips' two-year tenure as head coach (1892–1893), the program played without a head coach until 1900, when W. H. Fox assumed the position for two seasons (1900–1901).  The program then had several different head coaches until Hugh Nicol began a nine-year tenure in 1906.  Nicol's first season was also the program's first as a member of the Big Nine Conference (renamed the Big Ten Conference following the 1917 season, when Michigan rejoined the conference after a 12-season hiatus).  In 1909, Purdue won its first Big Ten Championship.  Future Major League Baseball player Walt Tragesser played on the 1909 team.

Nicol left the head coaching position following the 1914 season, and B. P. Pattison (previously the head coach at West Virginia) coached the team for the next two seasons (1915–1916).

In 1916, Pattison's final season, Purdue had an 8–4 record in Big Ten games.  However, Purdue had generally struggled in Big Ten games since joining the conference and continued to do so.  The Boilermakers had a winning conference record only 11 times from 1917–1978.  In that span, the team opened two new home venues.  On April 6, 1940, the team defeated Wabash College 7–4 in its first game at Ross–Ade Field, later renamed Lambert Field.  On April 14, 1965, the Boilermakers lost 4–2 to Notre Dame in the team's first game at the modern Lambert Field.  Both Old Lambert Field and the modern Lambert Field were named for Ward Lambert, head coach of the program for 19 seasons (1917, 1919–1935, 1945–1946).

Dave Alexander era
In 1978, Dave Alexander became the program's head coach.  When the Big Ten split into two, five-team divisions in 1981, the team finished 2nd behind Michigan, Purdue's best conference finish since 1928.  As a result of the second-place finish, the team qualified for the inaugural Big Ten Tournament, which was also the program's first postseason appearance.  The team finished the tournament with a 1–2 record.  Purdue qualified for two more conference tournaments in the 1980s (1986, 1987) and reached its first NCAA Tournament in 1987.  Playing in the Mideast Regional, Purdue went 0–2, losing 13–3 to Texas A&M and 8–7 to Western Carolina.

Steve Green era
Alexander stepped down from the head coaching position following the 1991 season as the program's all-time wins leader with 407.  He was replaced by Steve Green.  During Green's tenure, the team qualified for three Big Ten Tournaments (1993, 1995, 1997).  However, after a 2–9 start to the 1998 season, Green struck a player in an altercation following a loss to Evansville.  He resigned following the altercation.  Interim coach Bob Shepherd was the head coach for the rest of the 1998 season, and the team had a 21–20 record during Shepherd's tenure to finish 23–29 overall.

Doug Schreiber era
Prior to the 1999 season, Purdue hired Doug Schreiber as its permanent head coach.  In the 2000s decade, Schreiber's teams appeared in seven Big Ten Tournaments and finished second in the conference three times (2001, 2005, 2008).

In 2012, Purdue had its most successful season.  On April 15, Schreiber won his 407th and 408th games in a doubleheader sweep of Illinois, passing Dave Alexander as the program's winningest head coach.  The team, after winning both the regular season conference championship and the Big Ten Tournament, was given a #1 seed in the NCAA Tournament and hosted a regional.  Due to Lambert Field's not meeting NCAA standards and construction delays on the program's new home venue, Alexander Field, Purdue hosted the regional at U.S. Steel Yard in Gary, Indiana.  After winning its opening round game against Valparaiso, Purdue lost consecutive games to Kent State and Kentucky and was eliminated from the tournament.  Purdue finished the season with a 45 wins, a school record. Following the 2016 season, Schreiber resigned as the head baseball coach at Purdue.

Mark Wasikowski era
On June 24, 2016, Purdue hired Oregon Ducks baseball assistant coach, Mark Wasikowski to be the team's head coach. Purdue's 19 win improvement from 2016 to 2017 was the largest improvement in NCAA Division I baseball during the 2017 season. After leading Purdue to an 87–82 record over three seasons, Wasikowski left Purdue to become the head coach at Oregon.

Greg Goff era 
In 2019, Purdue hired Greg Goff to be their latest head coach. Goff led the team to a 23-32 record through his first two seasons as head coach.  

To begin their 2022 season, the Boilermakers produced the best start to a season since 1909, with series sweeps over Princeton and South Dakota State en route to an 8-0 start.

Conference affiliations
 Independent (1888–1905)
 Big Ten Conference (1906–present)
 Known as the Big Nine Conference from 1906–1917

Venues
Since the program began play in 1888, it has had four venues, each on the university's campus.

Stuart Field

From 1892–1939, the team played at Stuart Field on the university's campus.  Currently, the Elliott Hall of Music stands on the former site of Stuart Field.

Old Lambert Field
The Boilermakers played at Old Lambert Field from 1940–1964.  At the beginning of its use, Old Lambert Field was known as Ross–Ade Field (named for David E. Ross and George Ade, also the benefactors of Ross–Ade Stadium, the school's football venue).  Old Lambert Field was located next to Lambert Fieldhouse.

Lambert Field

The program played at Lambert Field from prior to the 1965 season until the end of the 2012 season.  Named for former Purdue baseball and men's basketball coach Ward Lambert, the venue had a capacity of 1,100 spectators.  It was torn down in summer 2012.  The field was located next to the current location of Purdue's Student Fitness and Wellness Center.

Alexander Field

In 2013, the program began playing at Alexander Field.  The venue was scheduled for completion prior to the 2012 season, but construction delays caused the completion date to be pushed back.  The venue has a capacity of 1,500 spectators.

Head coaches
The program's most successful coach was head coach Doug Schreiber, who had 485 victories at the school. Schreiber passed Dave Alexander on the Purdue wins list on April 15, 2012, when Purdue swept a doubleheader against Illinois.

Purdue's longest tenured head coach is Ward Lambert, who coached the team for a total of 19 seasons in three separate coaching stints.

Yearly record

†NCAA canceled all postseason activities for all college sports due to the COVID-19 virus.

Notable former players
Below is a list of notable former Boilermakers and the seasons in which they played for Purdue.

 Clyde Goodwin (1905–1906)
 Walt Tragesser (1908–1909)
 Frank Sigafoos (1923–1926)
 Hughie Wise (1926–1927)
 George Van Bibber (1929–1930)
 Dutch Fehring (1932–1934)
 Felix Mackiewicz (1938–1940)
 Bulbs Ehlers (1943, 1946)
 Bob Kelly (1946–1947)
 Bill "Moose" Skowron (1950)
 Joe McCabe (1958–1960)
 Bernie Allen (1959–1961)
 Matt Kinzer (1982–1984)
 Rico Rossy (1982–1985)
 Archi Cianfrocco (1987)
 Jermaine Allensworth (1991–1993)
 Dave Gassner (1998–2001)
 Jay Buente (2003–2006)
 Josh Lindblom (2007–2008)
 Cameron Perkins (2010–2012)
 Kevin Plawecki (2010–2012)
 Nick Wittgren (2011–2012)

2012 MLB Draft
In the 2012 Major League Baseball Draft, a program-record seven Purdue players were selected: C Kevin Plawecki by the New York Mets (1st round), 3B Cameron Perkins by the Philadelphia Phillies (6th round), P Nick Wittgren by the Miami Marlins (9th round), P Lance Breedlove by the Pittsburgh Pirates (23rd round), 2B Eric Charles by the San Diego Padres (29th round), OF Barrett Serrato by the Texas Rangers (30th round), and P Brad Schreiber by the Minnesota Twins (40th round).  P Blake Mascarello signed with the Phillies as an undrafted free agent.  Mascarello, along with six of the seven draftees (all but Schreiber) signed professional contracts.

See also
 List of NCAA Division I baseball programs

References

External links